Jonathan Alberto Bilbao Vásquez (born 29 July 1999) is a Venezuelan-Peruvian footballer who plays as a centre-back for Peruvian Primera División side Alianza Atlético.

Club career

Universidad San Martín
Born in Barquisimeto, the capital of the state of Lara in Venezuela, Bilbao started playing football at Deportivo Lara. Bilbao had two preseasons with the first team and was about to sign a professional contract with the club, before he got injured and was out for six months.

At the end of 2017 and for the first time, Bilbao came to Peru for a trip with his sister and his Peruvian father to visit his grandmother. Bilbao was supposed to try himself out at different Peruvian clubs, but ended up only training at Universidad San Martín because it was the only club with trials before he was going to return to Venezuela on 15 January 2017. However, two days before returning to Venezuela, San Martín coach, José Espinoza, told him to stay and he did.

Bilbao started on San Martíns reserve team. On 31 March 2019, he got his official debut in the Peruvian Primera División against FBC Melgar. Bilbao was in the starting lineup and played the whole game. He played a total of three games in the 2019 season for San Martíns first team.

Alianza Atlético
On 27 November 2021 it was confirmed, that Bilbao would join Alianza Atlético for the 2022 season.

International career
Bilbao's mother is from Venezuela and his father is from Peru. After arriving to Peru in January 2017, 19-year old Bilbao received his Peruvian Nationality Title in March 2018 and could now officially play for the Peruvian national teams.

After making his debut for Peru national under-20 football team in November 2018, Bilbao became a part of the squad that was called up for the 2019 South American U-20 Championship.

References

External links
 

Living people
1999 births
Association football defenders
Venezuelan footballers
Peruvian footballers
Peru youth international footballers
Peruvian Primera División players
Asociación Civil Deportivo Lara players
Club Deportivo Universidad de San Martín de Porres players
Alianza Atlético footballers
Sportspeople from Barquisimeto